Naye tsayt (נײַע צײַט, 'New Times') was a Yiddish-language newspaper published from Kiev between September 1917 and May 1919. Naye tsayt was an organ of the United Jewish Socialist Workers Party (fareynikte). Prior to the launching of Naye tsayt, the party published Der yidisher proletarier from Kiev.

In 1919, the newspaper was merged into Komunistishe fon.

References

Yiddish socialist newspapers
Publications established in 1917
Publications disestablished in 1919
Jewish Ukrainian history
Jews and Judaism in Kyiv
Yiddish culture in Ukraine
Secular Jewish culture in Ukraine